The Theological School of St. Lawrence University was founded in 1856 at St. Lawrence University and closed in 1965, one of the three Universalist seminaries (Crane Divinity School and Ryder Divinity School being the others). In 1858, there were four students. The school closed in 1965 with the consolidation of the Universalist Church of America and the American Unitarian Association into the Unitarian Universalist Association.

Notable people

Alumni
 Olympia Brown in 1863—the first woman in America to receive ordination with full denominational authority.
 Florence E. Kollock (1848-1925), Universalist minister and lecturer

Leaders
 1856–1879: Ebenezer Fisher (president)
 1879–1898: Isaac Morgan Atwood (president)
 1899–1913: Henry Prentiss Forbes (dean)
 1914–1951: John Murray Atwood (dean)
 1951–1960: Angus Hector MacLean (dean)
 1960–1965: Max Kapp (dean)

References

Seminaries and theological colleges in New York (state)
Unitarian Universalism
Unitarian Universalism in New York (state)
Universities and colleges affiliated with the Universalist Church of America
Educational institutions established in 1856
Educational institutions disestablished in 1965
St. Lawrence University
 
1856 establishments in New York (state)
1965 disestablishments in New York (state)